The University of Missouri–Kansas City School of Medicine, established 1971, is one of three medical schools located near downtown Kansas City. The school offers an accelerated combined Bachelor/MD program based on a six-year curriculum. The school of medicine admits students into the program directly from high school and within six years the graduates attain an undergraduate and a doctor of medicine degree (BA/MD) from UMKC. The curriculum integrates the liberal arts, basic sciences, and clinical sciences with a team approach to learning. More than 2,000 physicians have graduated from the UMKC–SOM six-year combined degree program.  The program is extremely competitive.  For the 2015-2016 application cycle, at least 40% of all successful out of state applicants received admissions prep.

Location

The school of medicine is located in the Hospital Hill neighborhood of Kansas City, MO along with the UMKC schools of dentistry, pharmacy, and nursing. Adjacent hospitals include the University Health Truman Medical Center hospital complex (the primary teaching hospital) and Children's Mercy Hospital (the only free-standing children's hospital between Denver and St. Louis). Medical students are also able to do rotations throughout the greater Kansas City area. These include Saint Luke's Hospital of Kansas City, Providence Medical Center, Research Medical Center, and University Health Lakewood Medical Center.

The Docent Experience at UMKC
A distinctive aspect of the UMKC School of Medicine is the docent experience. In the docent education system, students are divided into groups of about 12 and are assigned to a practicing Internal Medicine physician who is then referred to as their "Docent." In the first two years, students are assigned to docents for internal medicine (year one), pediatrics/OB-Gyn, Psychiatry, Geriatrics, and other primary care fields (year two). When students have completed much of their basic coursework they are "promoted to the Hill." Hospital Hill is the location of the UMKC Health Sciences Center, as well as Truman Medical Center and Children's Mercy Hospital. At this point, the students are given their own offices and become more involved in hands-on patient care. This is a crucial way to ensure the students learn about continuing care.

In the fifth year of the program, after successful completion of USMLE Step 1, students begin their core rotations and electives. As of 2019–20, the rotation requirements are two months each in Pediatrics, Surgery, Obstetrics & Gynecology, followed by one month each in Psychiatry, Emergency Medicine, Family Rural Preceptorship, and electives pertinent to each student's chosen specialty. While on these required/elective rotations students maintain their continuity clinic obligations, maximizing clinical exposure.

UMKC-SOM also offers 15 specialty residency programs and 20 subspecialties.

Student organizations

UMKC-SOM runs a student-operated outpatient clinic on Sundays called the Sojourner Free Health Clinic.  It caters to the under-served adult population of Greater Kansas City, offering physical exams, prescription drugs, lab work, and various social services free of charge.  Students have logged more than 2,600 volunteer hours and have seen more than 530 patients since the clinic opened in 2004. The Sojourner Free Health Clinic has recently partnered with the UMKC Schools of Social Work and Pharmacy.

Previous UMKC-SOM medical students and UMKC undergraduate students have volunteered at The Kansas City Free Eye Clinic, a non-UMKC affiliated organization, since 2009, which will offer eye exams, prescription glasses, outpatient surgeries, and other visual health services.

Associated hospitals
The main teaching hospitals of UMKC-SOM are Kansas City VA Medical Center, University Health Truman Medical Center, Children's Mercy Hospital, and Saint Luke's Hospital of Kansas City. The university however does have relations with other nearby facilities in the KC Metro area such as:
 University Health Lakewood Medical Center
 Western Missouri Mental Health Center
 Saint Luke's Northland
 Research Medical Center-Brookside Campus
 Menorah Medical Center
 Research Medical Center
 Trinity-Lutheran Hospital
 Overland Park Regional Medical Center
 Providence Medical Center
 AdventHealth Shawnee Mission

Nearby related institutes
Stowers Institute for Medical Research
Linda Hall Library

References

External links

 

Medical schools in Missouri
Medicine
Educational institutions established in 1971
1971 establishments in Missouri
University subdivisions in Missouri